Cepeda is a Spanish surname dating back to the 12th century. Notable people with the surname include:

Amaranta Osorio Cepeda (born 1978), Mexican playwright, actress and arts manager
Andrés Cepeda (born 1973), Colombian singer
Angie Cepeda (born 1974), Colombian actress
Arturo Cepeda (born 1969), Mexican-American Catholic prelate
Bonny Cepeda (born 1954), Dominican Republic musician 
Boris Cepeda (born 1974), German-Ecuadorian Pianist and Diplomat
Christian Cepeda (born 1991), Argentine professional footballer
Cláudia Cepeda (born 1967), Brazilian actress
Diego Ramirez de Cepeda (died 1629), Peruvian Roman Catholic prelate
Dolores Cepeda (1965–1977), American girl strangled and raped by the Hillside Stranglers
Ender Cepeda (born 1945), Venezuelan painter
Enrique Cepeda, Cuban paralympic athlete
Esther J. Cepeda, syndicated columnist for the Chicago Sun-Times
Francisco Cepeda (1532–1602), Spanish-Dominican missionary
Francisco Cepeda (cyclist) (1906–1935), Spanish cyclist
Frederich Cepeda (born 1980), Cuban baseball player
Jefferson Alexander Cepeda (born 1998), Ecuadorian cyclist
Jefferson Alveiro Cepeda (born 1996), Ecuadorian cyclist
José Cevallos Cepeda (1831–1893), Mexican politician and military leader
Julio Cepeda (born 1932), Mexican cyclist
Laura Cepeda (born 1953), Spanish actress
Liliana "Barbarita" Cepeda (1990–1997), Puerto Rican girl whose death caused an investigation
Lorna Cepeda (born 1970), Colombian actress
Luis Cepeda (born 1989), Spanish singer
Marco Cepeda (born 1974), Spanish middle-distance runner
Natividad Cepeda, Spanish poet, writer and habitual columnist
Orlando Cepeda (born 1937), Puerto Rican former Major League Baseball player
Pedro Cepeda (1905–1955), Puerto Rican baseball player
Rafael Cepeda (1910–1996), patriarch of the musical Cepeda family
Ramiro Cepeda (born 1975), former Argentine football manager and former player
Raquel Cepeda (born 1973), American journalist, critic, film-maker, and autobiographer
Rolando Cepeda (born 1989), Cuban male volleyball player
Rubén Cepeda (born 1994), Chilean footballer
Santiago Cepeda (born 1986), Colombian poet and novelist.
Wellington Cepeda (born 1973), Dominican former professional baseball player and current coach
Wilson Cepeda (born 1980), Colombian road cyclist

Spanish-language surnames